James S. Crews (born February 14, 1954) is an American former men's college basketball coach for Saint Louis University. He was promoted to head coach after serving on an interim basis following the health concerns and eventual death of former Billikens head coach Rick Majerus. He was on Majerus' staff since 2011.  After leading the Billikens to a school-record 28 wins, Crews was formally named SLU's 25th head coach on April 12, 2013. He was fired after the 2016 Atlantic 10 tournament resulted in the elimination of the Billikens and marked the end of two 11–21 Billikens seasons.

Crews spent the first 13 years of his adult life at Indiana University under Bob Knight.  He played on the 1976 NCAA Championship-winning team, the last undefeated champion in the men's division.  After graduating, he served as an assistant on Knight's staff for eight years before moving to the University of Evansville in 1985.  In 17 years, he led the Purple Aces to five NCAA Tournaments.  His best team was the 1988–89 unit, which tallied the school's only NCAA Tournament win to date.  He then coached at the United States Military Academy for seven years.

Head coaching record

References

External links
 Saint Louis profile

1954 births
Living people
American men's basketball coaches
Army Black Knights men's basketball coaches
Basketball coaches from Illinois
Basketball players from Illinois
Evansville Purple Aces men's basketball coaches
Indiana Hoosiers men's basketball coaches
Indiana Hoosiers men's basketball players
People from Normal, Illinois
Saint Louis Billikens men's basketball coaches
American men's basketball players